Lawrence 'Laurie' Levine is a male former weightlifter who competed for England.

Weightlifting career
He represented England in the -75 Kg combined category at the 1958 British Empire and Commonwealth Games in Cardiff, Wales. Eight years later he competed once again in the -75 Kg combined category at the 1966 British Empire and Commonwealth Games in Kingston, Jamaica. A third Commonwealth Games appearance resulted when he represented England, at the 1970 British Commonwealth Games in Edinburgh, Scotland.

He was also the British middleweight champion.

He was a member of Maccabi London weightlifting team and won a gold medal at the 1965 Maccabiah Games.

References

1932 births
2015 deaths
English male weightlifters
Weightlifters at the 1958 British Empire and Commonwealth Games
British Jews
Jewish weightlifters
Maccabiah Games medalists in weightlifting
Maccabiah Games gold medalists for Great Britain
Competitors at the 1965 Maccabiah Games
Commonwealth Games competitors for England